The 2005 Holden Performance Driving Centre V8 Supercar Series was an Australian touring car series held for V8 Supercars. It was the sixth series held for second tier V8 Supercars competitors. The season began on 18 March 2005 at Wakefield Park and finished on 27 November at Phillip Island Grand Prix Circuit. The season consisted of seven rounds held across four different states. The series was expanded for 2005, incorporating the previously stand-alone support race at Bathurst 1000 into a series round and adding a finale on the support program of the Bigpond Grand Finale.

Dean Canto, driving for Dick Johnson Racing's two car team, dominated the expanded series, winning ten races, and five of the seven rounds, which made Canto the first multiple winner of the series and directly led to a full-time return to V8 Supercar Championship Series with Garry Rogers Motorsport. Series runner up Paul Cruickshank Racing driver Warren Luff failed to score a win, staying in touch with Canto through consistency. Adam Macrow was the other multiple race-winner, taking victory four times, but some unlucky results saw him finish fourth in the points race behind Gary MacDonald. Shane Beikoff, Lee Holdsworth and Dale Brede took the remaining wins with Race 2 at Bathurst declared a no result after a multi-car collision blocked the track after just six laps.

Teams and drivers
The following teams and drivers competed in the series.

Race calendar

Points system
The series comprised seven rounds across four different states. Rounds 2, 3, 4 and 5 each consisted of three races. The second race of each weekend saw the finishing order of Race 1 reversed to form the grid, a 'reverse grid' race. Rounds 1, 6 and 7 each consisted of two races.  Points were offered down to 32nd position in each race but at no point during the season did more than 24 cars finish a race.

Series standings 

Note: Due to time constraints, Race 2 at the Bathurst round was abandoned and no points were awarded.

References

External links
 2005 Racing Results Archive

See also
 2005 V8 Supercar season

Holden
Supercars Development Series